Şıxakəran (also, Şıxəkəran, Shikhakeran’, and Shykhakeran) is a village and municipality in the Lankaran Rayon of Azerbaijan.  It has a population of 2,906.

References 

Populated places in Lankaran District